Argyresthia dilectella is a moth of the family Yponomeutidae. It is found in Northern Europe and Central Europe.

The wingspan is 7–9 mm. The head is white. Forewings are violet-whitish, suffusedly mixed and irrorated with brownish golden; a transverse oblique mark from middle of dorsum, a small spot on middle of costa and another beyond it usually darker golden-brown ; some small darker spots towards apex. Hindwings are pale grey.

The moth flies from June to August. .

The larvae feed on Juniperus communis and Chamaecyparis.

References

Notes
The flight season refers to Belgium and The Netherlands. This may vary in other parts of the range.

External links
 waarneming.nl 
 Lepidoptera of Belgium
 Argyresthia dilectella at UK Moths

Moths described in 1847
Argyresthia
Moths of Europe